Gare de Flers is a railway station serving the town Flers, Orne department, northwestern France.

Services

The station is served by regional trains to Argentan, Paris and Granville.

References

External links
 

Railway stations in Orne
Railway stations in France opened in 1866